Pacific Beach may refer to:
Pacific Beach, Washington
Pacific Beach, San Diego, a community and beach